The Ripsaw is a series of developmental unmanned ground combat vehicles designed by Howe & Howe Technologies (now part of Textron Systems) for evaluation by the United States Army.

The Howe brothers started the Ripsaw as a small family project in 2000. They introduced it at a Dallas vehicle show in 2001, where it caught the interest of the U.S. Army. Later that year the U.S. military ordered a prototype MS-1 to be made and shipped to Iraq.

The Ripsaw is intended to perform various missions including convoy protection, perimeter defense, surveillance, rescue, border patrol, crowd control, and explosive ordnance disposal. For perimeter defense or crowd control, a belt of M5 crowd control munitions (MCCM) can be mounted around the vehicle to break up crowds or engage personnel with less-lethal flash-bang effects and rubber bullets. Cameras provide 360-degree coverage for situational awareness for the operator.

Its weapon system is modified to fire remotely using the Advanced Remote Armament System (ARAS), a gun that loads its own ammunition and can swap out various types of ammunition, such as lethal and less-lethal, in just a few seconds. These capabilities allow manned vehicles to send the Ripsaw out in front of them and engage targets without exposing soldiers to threats. As of March 2017, the Army was still testing the vehicle as an unmanned platform to test remote controlled weapon stations.

In October 2019, Textron and Howe & Howe unveiled their Ripsaw M5 vehicle, and on 9 January 2020, the U.S. Army awarded them a contract for the Robotic Combat Vehicle-Medium (RCV-M) program. Four Ripsaw M5 prototypes are to be delivered and used in a company-level to determine the feasibility of integrating unmanned vehicles into ground combat operations in late 2021. The RCV-M is armed with a 30 mm autocannon and a pair of anti-tank missiles. The standard armor package can withstand 12.7×108mm rounds, with optional add-on armor increasing weight to up to 20 tons. If disabled, it will retain the ability to shoot, with its sensors and radio uplink prioritized to continue transmitting as its primary function.

Variants
Ripsaw MS1 tactical UGV utilized a powerful oversized and customized  Duramax 6.6L V8 diesel engine that delivers  of torque. The Ripsaw MS1 was a test platform made to test off-road capabilities.
Ripsaw MS2 UGV is made to be larger, faster, and more modular than the MS1. It weighs  and can carry a  payload. The vehicle can traverse 50-degree gradients and 45-degree slopes. It can be optionally manned or tele-operated from a nearby command vehicle. Armament can include an M240 machine gun or M2 .50-caliber machine gun, and it has been tested with the Javelin missile. If the Ripsaw is damaged or destroyed, parts can be "cannibalized" in the field and re-assembled quickly. An MS2 vehicle costs $750,000.
Ripsaw MS3 UGV is being tested by United States Army Research, Development and Engineering Command under the Remote Armed Maneuver Platform (RAMP) initiative to integrate the M153 CROWS remote weapon system onto an unmanned vehicle. RAMP was demonstrated at Fort Benning, Georgia in October 2013 as part of the Army's Armed Unmanned Ground Vehicle (AUGV) program.
Ripsaw EV2 is a luxury version, with a fully enclosed body and two seats inside the cab. It is currently unknown if the EV2 can mount remotely-operated weapon systems or not. This model is designed for the civilian market and costs $295,000 with customizable features.
Ripsaw M5 is a fully autonomous, all electric tank with a modular design and max speed up to 60 mph (96 km/h).
Ripsaw F4 is the latest civil variant that will now allow 4 passengers with max speed up to 55 mph.

See also

Black Knight (vehicle)
Gladiator Tactical Unmanned Ground Vehicle

References

Textron
Light tanks of the United States
Post–Cold War light tanks
Trial and research tanks of the United States
Unmanned ground combat vehicles